Mate Garković (12 September 1882 - 26 May 1968) was the Roman Catholic archbishop of the Archdiocese of Zadar, Croatia.

Life 
Garković was born on 12 September 1882 in Veli Rat on the island of Dugi Otok in Dalmatia, then Austria-Hungary. Ordained as a Roman Catholic priest on 28 July 1907, he was firstly pedagogue in the Zmajević minor seminary in Zadar where he stayed until 1914.  In 1914, he was appointed parish priest of Preko and dean of the Ugljan Deanery. When the Italians occupied Dalmatia, Garković was arrested and imprisoned for six months in Sestrunj. Then returned to Preko where he remained until 1925. Next 20 years, he has worked as a professor of pastoral theology and Hebrew in Split.

Garković was appointed Apostolic Administrator of Zadar on 22 February 1952. He was consecrated as bishop by Miho Pušić, archbishop of Hvar on 30 March 1952. Garković was appointed the archbishop of Zadar on 24 December 1960.

Garković died on 26 May 1968, aged 85 in Zadar. He was buried in the Cathedral of St. Anastasia, Zadar.

Notes

Zadar
1882 births
1968 deaths
Archbishops of Zadar
Dugi Otok
Roman Catholic archbishops in Yugoslavia